The Three Stigmata of Palmer Eldritch is a 1964 science fiction novel by  American writer Philip K. Dick. It was nominated for the Nebula Award for Best Novel in 1965. Like many of Dick's novels, it utilizes an array of science fiction concepts and explores the ambiguous slippage between reality and unreality. It is one of Dick's first works to explore religious themes.

The novel takes place in a future 2016 where humankind has colonized every habitable planet and moon in the Solar System. To cope with the difficult life away from Earth, colonists rely on the illegal hallucinogen Can-D, secretly distributed by corporate head Leo Bulero. New tensions arise with the rumor that merchant explorer Palmer Eldritch has returned from an expedition in possession of a new alien hallucinogen to compete with Can-D.

Plot summary
The story begins in a future world where global temperatures have risen so high that in most of the world it is unsafe to be outside without special cooling gear during daylight hours. In a desperate bid to preserve humanity and ease population burdens on Earth, the UN has initiated a "draft" for colonizing the nearby planets, where conditions are so horrific and primitive that the unwilling colonists have fallen prey to a form of escapism involving the use of an illegal drug (Can-D) in concert with "layouts." Layouts are physical props intended to simulate a sort of alternative reality where life is easier than either the grim existence of the colonists in their marginal off-world colonies, or even Earth, where global warming has progressed to the point that Antarctica is prime vacation resort territory. The illegal drug Can-D allows people to "share" their experience of the "Perky Pat" (the name of the main female character in the simulated world) layouts. This "sharing" has caused a pseudo-religious cult or series of cults to grow up around the layouts and the use of the drug.

Up to the point where the novel begins, New York City-based Perky Pat (or P.P.) Layouts, Inc., has held a monopoly on this product, as well as on the illegal trade in the drug Can-D which makes the shared hallucinations possible.

The novel opens shortly after Barney Mayerson, P.P. Layouts' top precog, has received a "draft notice" from the UN for involuntary resettlement as a colonist on Mars. Mayerson is sleeping with his assistant, Roni Fugate, but remains conflicted about the divorce, which he himself initiated, from his first wife Emily, a ceramic pot artist. Meanwhile, Emily's second husband tries to sell her pot designs to P.P. Layouts as possible accessories for the Perky Pat virtual worlds—but Barney, recognizing them as Emily's, rejects them out of spite.

Meanwhile, the UN rescues Palmer Eldritch's ship from a crash on Pluto. Leo Bulero, head of P.P. Layouts and an "evolved" human (meaning someone who has undergone expensive genetic treatments by a German "doctor" which are supposed to push the client "forward" on an evolutionary scale, and which result in gross physical, as well as mental, modifications), hears rumors that Eldritch discovered an alien hallucinogen in the Prox system with similar properties to Can-D, and that he plans to market it as "Chew-Z," with UN approval, on off-world colonies. However Chew-Z does not require the prop of the external layouts and seems to have certain undefined qualities that make the use of Chew-Z even more addictive than Can-D has been. This would effectively destroy P.P. Layouts. Bulero tries to contact Eldritch but he is quarantined at a UN hospital. Both Mayerson and Fugate have precognitions of reports that Bulero is going to be responsible for murdering Eldritch.

Under the guise of a reporter, Bulero travels to Eldritch's estate on the Moon, where Eldritch holds a press conference. Bulero is kidnapped and forced to take Chew-Z intravenously. He enters a psychic netherworld over which both he and Eldritch seemingly have some control. After wrangling about business with Eldritch, Bulero travels to what appears to be Earth at some time in the not-too-distant future. Evolved humans identify him as a ghost and show him a monument to himself commemorating his role in the death of Eldritch, an "enemy of the Sol System."

Bulero returns to Earth and fires Mayerson because Mayerson was afraid to travel to the Moon to rescue him. Mayerson, in despair, accepts his UN conscription to Mars but Bulero recruits him as a double agent. Mayerson is to inject himself with a toxin after taking Chew-Z in a plot to deceive the UN into thinking Chew-Z is harmful and cause them to ban it.

On Mars, Mayerson buys some Chew-Z from Eldritch, who appears in holographic form. Mayerson tries to hallucinate a world where he is still with Emily but finds that he does not control his apparent hallucination. Like Bulero, he finds himself in the future. Mayerson arrives in New York two years hence where he speaks with Bulero, Fugate and his future self about the death of Palmer Eldritch.

He also encounters several manifestations of Eldritch, identifiable by their robotic right hand, artificial eyes, and steel teeth. Eldritch offers to help Mayerson become whatever he wants, but is so controlling of the Chew-Z alternative reality that Mayerson ultimately decides he'd rather be dead than continue to be manipulated by Eldritch. When a despairing Mayerson chooses death, he finds himself apparently forced into Eldritch's body right at the point in the timeline where Bulero is ready to shoot a torpedo at Eldritch's ship. It appears that Eldritch's plan is to preserve his own life essence housed in Mayerson's body while allowing Mayerson himself to die in Eldritch's place. Eldritch, meanwhile, intends to live on in Mayerson's form and enjoy the simple if arduous life of a Martian colonist. Mayerson, stuck in Eldritch's body and mistaken for him, is indeed nearly killed by Bulero in the near future, but before the fatal shot can be fired he is awakened from his Chew-Z trance in the present by Bulero, who has just arrived on Mars.

Bulero is willing to take Mayerson back to Earth but refuses to after learning that Mayerson did not inject himself with the toxin. Mayerson is now confident that Bulero will kill Eldritch, so the sacrifice of taking the toxin in order to ruin Eldritch's business is unnecessary; but he does not try to convince Bulero of this. Later, Mayerson discusses his experience with a neo-Christian colonist and they conclude that either Eldritch became a god in the Prox system or some god-like being has taken his place. Mayerson is convinced some aspect of Eldritch is still inside him, and that as long as he refuses to take Chew-Z again, it is Eldritch who will actually be killed by Bulero in the near future; Mayerson is half-resigned, half-hopeful about taking on the life of a Martian colonist without reprieve. Mayerson considers the possibility of Eldritch being what humans have always thought of as a god, but inimical, or perhaps merely an inferior aspect of a bigger and better sort of god.

The novel has an ambiguous ending, with Bulero heading back toward Earth, and apparent proliferation of Eldritch's cyborg body 'stigmata', which may mean that Bulero is still trapped in Eldritch's hallucinatory domain, or that Chew-Z is becoming increasingly popular among Terrans and Martian colonists.

Material used from prior work
 The Perky Pat and Connie Companion products were introduced in the novelette "The Days of Perky Pat" published in 1963. However, the novel is not a continuation (e.g.  "What the Dead Men Say" and the novel Ubik) or expansion (e.g. the novella and later novel Vulcan's Hammer) of an earlier and shorter work.
 Early in Chapter 3 a reference is made to "...the Printers, the Biltong life forms ..." taken from the short story "Pay for the Printer", published in 1956.
 Precognition as an accepted vocation figures heavily in the plot of Dick's short story "The Minority Report" (first published in 1956) and in his 1970 novel Our Friends From Frolix 8.

Reception and legacy
Algis Budrys of Galaxy Science Fiction described the novel as "an important, beautifully controlled, smoothly created book which will twist your mind if you give it the least chance to do so". He praised Dick's accomplishment, saying "the whole creation resonates to the touch of the only present science-fiction writer who could possibly have done it" and characterizes the result as "a witty, sometimes lighthearted, and always fascinating piece of fiction". Budrys later named the book the best science-fiction novel of his first year as reviewer for the magazine, reporting that others "are calling it some kind of half-conscious failure".

Weird fiction writer China Mieville listed this book as one of his top weird fiction books of all time, saying "It's infuriating to have to choose just one of Dick's works - he is the outstanding figure in SF. In the end I went for Stigmata because I remember how I felt when I put it down. Hollow and beaten. I kept thinking: "That's it. It's finished. Literature has been finished."

In a 2003 retrospective review, sci-fi and fantasy author Michael Moorcock criticized The Three Stigmata of Palmer Eldritch as thematically "incoherent", complaining about Dick's lack of an "idiosyncratic structure or style".

See also

 Simulated reality
 Existenz (1999 film)
 Inception (2010 film)

References

Sources
 Rossi, Umberto. "Dick e la questione della tecnica (o Della tecnologia)", Technology and the American Imagination: An Ongoing Challenge, Atti del XII Convegno biennale AISNA, Eds. Mamoli Zorzi and Bisutti de Riz, Venezia: Supernova, 1994, p. 473–83.

External links
 
 

1964 American novels
1964 science fiction novels
American science fiction novels
Climate change novels
Cyborgs in literature
Doubleday (publisher) books
Dystopian novels
Fiction about superhuman features or abilities
Fiction about God
Holography in fiction
Novels set on Mars
Metaphysical fiction novels
Novels about drugs
Novels by Philip K. Dick
Novels set on the Moon
Fiction set around Proxima Centauri
Postmodern novels
Psychedelic literature
Psychotherapy in fiction
Religion in science fiction
Time in fiction